Mes Kerman Football Club (Bashgah-e Futbal-e Sân't-e Mes Kârman) is an Iranian professional football team based in Kerman, Iran.
They were promoted to Iran's top league, the Iran Pro League, in the 2005–06 season. They won their only domestic double in 2006–2007 season with the help of Mohammad Fakori. They have been relegated at the 2013–14 season. The team is named after and sponsored by Kerman's copper industries (Persian: مس romanized: mes).

Mes Kerman F.C. is a football section of the multisport Sanat Mes Kerman Cultural and Athletic Club, who are best known for their success in the field of cycling.

History

Establishment
Mes Kerman Football Club was formed on 2 March 1998 by Kerman's copper industry. The national Iranian copper industry had already formed a football team in Rasfanjan a year prior. They started playing in Iran Football's 2nd Division and were promoted to the Azadegan League in 2000. Bijan Zolfagharnasab was appointed in 2000 as head coach of the club after the team was promoted to the Azadegan League.

Azadegan League (2000–2007)
They was promoted to the Azadegan League in 2000–01 season. In 2005–06 season under management of Nader Dastneshan, the club was promoted to the IPL for the 2006–07 season.

Persian Gulf Cup (2007–2014)
They started the league in 2007 with Farhad Kazemi and but he was replaced by Amir Ghalenoei halfway through the season where they finished second in the second half of the season league.
Parviz Mazloomi was appointed in 2008 as the head coach and the club was promoted to the AFC Champions League for the first time in their history by finishing third in the league. Mes surprisingly progressed to the last 16 and but got knocked out by fellow countrymen Zob Ahan. In that same season the club finished ninth in the league.

Return to Azadegan League
In the 2013–14 Iran Pro League season, Mes finished bottom of the league and were relegated to the Azadegan League with one matchday left. In the same season Mes reached the 2014 Hazfi Cup Final losing 1–0 to Tractor Sazi. On 27 April 2015 after a 0–0 draw against Aluminium Hormozgan, Mes Kerman secured a spot in the Persian Gulf Pro League promotion play-off. However, they lost to Esteghlal Khuzestan to miss the qualification. Riots ensued in the stadium afterwards as Mes fans set fires to the seats. In March 2016 Mes Kerman coach Begovic was replaced with Akbar Misaghian.

Colours and crest
From the foundation of the club, the home kit includes an orange shirt, white shorts, and white or black socks. White and black colours are also seen in the kit. The away kit of the club is usually dominated with a white background.

Stadium and facilities

The club currently plays its home games at Kerman's Shahid Bahonar Stadium, but the club recently announced plans to build its own football only stadium. Construction started on July 13, 2004 for the 15,000 capacity stadium.

Ownership
The owner of the Mes Kerman FC is National Mes Company, one of the most important companies in Iran. The company opened in 1940, and is based close to the city of Kerman.

Sponsorship

Season-by-season
The table below chronicles the achievements of Mes kerman since 2001.

{|class="wikitable collapsible collapsed"
|-bgcolor="#efefef"
! Season
! Div.
! Pos.
!Hazfi Cup
!Asian Cup
|-
|align=center|2001–02
|align=center|Div 1
|align=center|3rd
|rowspan=5|did not enter
|rowspan=8|did not qualify
|-
|align=center|2002–03
|align=center|Div 1
|align=center|14th
|-
|align=center|2003–04
|align=center|Div 1
|align=center|13th
|-
|align=center|2004–05
|align=center|Div 1
|align=center|5th
|-
|align=center|2005–06
|align=center|Div 1
|align=center bgcolor=99FF66|1st
|-
|align=center|2006–07
|align=center|IPL
|align=center|9th
|align=center|1/18 Final
|-
|align=center|2007–08
|align=center|IPL
|align=center|10th
|align=center|1/16 Final
|-
|align=center|2008–09
|align=center|IPL
|align=center|3rd
|align=center|1/16 Final
|-
|align=center|2009–10
|align=center|IPL
|align=center|9th
|align=center|Quarter Final
|align=center|Round of 16
|-
|align=center|2010–11
|align=center|IPL
|align=center|7th
|align=center|1/16 Final
|rowspan=5|did not qualify
|-
|align=center|2011–12
|align=center|IPL
|align=center|9th
|align=center|Semi Final
|-
|align=center|2012–13
|align=center|IPL
|align=center|6th
|align=center|1/16 Final
|-
|align=center|2013–14
|align=center|IPL
|align=center bgcolor=FFCCCC|16th
|align=center bgcolor=Silver|Final
|-
|align=center|2014–15
|align=center|Div 1
|align=center |2nd
|align=center |3rd Round
|}

Continental record

Honours
Azadegan League:
Winners: 2005–06
Runners-Up (1): 2021–22
2nd Division:
Winners (1): 1999–00
Runners-Up (1): 1998–99
Hazfi Cup:
Runners-Up (1): 2013–14

Players

As of 9 August, 2022

First-team squad

 

 

 

For recent transfers, see List of Iranian football transfers summer 2022.

Former playersFor details on former players, see :Category:Sanat Mes Kerman F.C. players.''

Club officials

Managers

 * = Caretaker manager

Current Coaching Staff

Chairpersons

Notes

External links

 Player Statistics

Official
  Official club website

 
Football clubs in Iran
Association football clubs established in 1998
1998 establishments in Iran